The George F. Schlicher Hotel is an historic hotel which is located in Alburtis, Pennsylvania in the Lehigh Valley metropolitan area of eastern Pennsylvania.

It was added to the National Register of Historic Places in 1992.

History and architectural features  
Built in 1877, the George F. Schlicher Hotel is a three-and-one-half-story brick building, which was designed in a Victorian architectural style. It features elaborate porchway arches and gingerbread woodwork.

A frame addition was built during the early 1900s. 

The building was converted to apartments in 1944.

It was added to the National Register of Historic Places in 1992.

References

Hotel buildings on the National Register of Historic Places in Pennsylvania
Hotel buildings completed in 1877
Buildings and structures in Lehigh County, Pennsylvania
National Register of Historic Places in Lehigh County, Pennsylvania
1877 establishments in Pennsylvania